Josef Škvor (born 8 December 1929) is a Czech gymnast. He competed at the 1952 Summer Olympics and the 1956 Summer Olympics.

References

1929 births
Living people
Czech male artistic gymnasts
Olympic gymnasts of Czechoslovakia
Gymnasts at the 1952 Summer Olympics
Gymnasts at the 1956 Summer Olympics